The 2018 Penn Quakers football team represented the University of Pennsylvania during the 2018 NCAA Division I FCS football season. They were led by fourth-year head coach Ray Priore and played their home games at Franklin Field. They were a member of the Ivy League. They finished the season 6–4 overall 3–3 in Ivy League play to place in a three-way tie for fourth. Penn averaged 7,767 fans per game.

Previous season
The Quakers finished the 2017 season 6–4, 4–3 in Ivy League play, to finish in fourth place.

Preseason

Award watch lists

Schedule

Game summaries

Bucknell

Lehigh

at Dartmouth

at Sacred Heart

Columbia

Yale

at Brown

at Cornell

Harvard

at Princeton

Roster

References

Penn
Penn Quakers football seasons
Penn Quakers football